Scott Ninnis (born 25 December 1965) is an Australian former professional basketball player and coach who played most of his career with the Adelaide 36ers in the National Basketball League (NBL). He won three NBL championships during his career: 1986 and 1998 with the 36ers and 1992 with the South East Melbourne Magic. Ninnis also represented the Australian national basketball team during his career. He coached the Adelaide 36ers for two years and was an assistant coach with the club when they won the 1998–99 and 2001–02 NBL championships.

Early life and education
Ninnis's father Bruce was a championship winning basketball player with South Adelaide during the 1960s. Scott started playing church basketball at the age of 7 before joining South Adelaide when he was just 11 years old.

Scott Ninnis attended Marion High School in Adelaide, and completed Year 12 at Daws Road High School due to their basketball program.

Professional career
After producing a 40-point game against the West Adelaide Bearcats in the local Adelaide competition in early 1985, Ninnis was invited to train with National Basketball League team the Adelaide 36ers by 36ers coach Ken Cole in 1985, training against NBL stars such as Al Green, Darryl Pearce, Mike McKay, Ray Wood, Bill Jones, Peter Ali and Mark Davis.

Ninnis made his NBL debut on 12 July 1986 during Round 10 of the 1986 NBL season against the Perth Wildcats at the home of the 36ers, the Apollo Stadium. He would go on to play 13 more regular season games for the team which compiled a league best 24–2 record during the regular season, earning the team the nickname "The Invincibles". The 1986 Adelaide 36ers would go on to win their first NBL Grand Final in 1986, defeating the defending champions the Brisbane Bullets 2–1 in the Grand Final series. Ninnis only got to play in the final 30 seconds of Game 3 during the series which the 36ers won 113–91.

36ers coach Ken Cole was sacked after a marijuana smoking controversy in 1986 and was replaced by former NBL import guard Gary Fox. Unfortunately for Ninnis, Fox sent him down to play with the Adelaide Buffaloes in the SEABL in 1987 and he only played 2 NBL games during the 1987 NBL season (for a total of just 5 minutes and 18 seconds). However, it was not a total loss for Ninnis as the Buffaloes would go on to win the SEABL championship that year after defeating the Ballarat Miners in the Grand Final.

Scott Ninnis was recalled back into the 36ers squad by Fox full-time from 1988. He would remain with the club until the end of the 1990 NBL season before making the decision that if he wanted to further his game he would need a change of scenery. He then signed with the Brian Goorjian coached Eastside Melbourne Spectres in 1991 NBL season and played in his second NBL Grand Final that year, though the Spectres went down to the defending champion Perth Wildcats.

While playing for the 36ers, Ninnis continued to play for South Adelaide in the SA State League (now Premier League), winning the championship in 1987 and again in 1989.

The Spectres and the Southern Melbourne Saints merged prior to the 1992 NBL season to become the South East Melbourne Magic with Ninnis signing with the new team who would be coached by Brian Goorjian. Alongside teammates including Tony Ronaldson, Bruce Bolden, Robert Rose, John Dorge and current (2016) Australian Boomers head coach Andrej Lemanis, Ninnis won his second NBL Championship after the Magic defeated cross-town rivals the Melbourne Tigers 2–1 in the Grand Final series. During Game 1 of the series, Magic point guard Darren Perry went down with an injury. Ninnis, normally a shooting guard, stepped in and played the point for the remainder of the series.

Scott Ninnis returned home to play for the 36ers in 1993 and would go on to win that season's NBL Most Improved Player award. Statistically, 1993 would be Ninnis' best year in the NBL, averaging 19.4 points, 3.1 rebounds and 4.7 assists for the season.

In 1994 under the coaching of Mike Dunlap, the 36ers reached their first NBL Grand Final since 1986, but the team would be swept 2–0 in the series by the North Melbourne Giants. At the end of the 1995 NBL season where the 36ers were beaten by the eventual champion Perth Wildcats in the Semi-finals, Ninnis was cut from the team by Dunlap who as a former NCAA college basketball coach, had gained a reputation for favouring the younger players at the expense of the team veterans (during this period the 36ers also cut veterans Phil Smyth (1994) and Robert Rose and Mike McKay (1996).

Upon returning to Adelaide in 1993, Ninnis rejoined South Adelaide in the local State League and won the championship for the third time in 1995. That year he also won the Woollacott Medal as the State League's fairest and most brilliant player.

After being cut by the 36ers, Ninnis signed for the struggling Newcastle Falcons for the 1996 NBL season. Ninnis would only spend one year with the Falcons before again returning to the 36ers in 1997 after Dunlap left the club and was replaced with Dave Claxton.

Phil Smyth returned to the 36ers in 1998 as a rookie head coach and immediately turned the 36ers into a championship winning team. Alongside team captain Brett Maher, Mark Davis (the only other survivor of the 1986 championship team), Martin Cattalini, Paul Rees and former Denver Nuggets NBA players Darnell Mee and Kevin Brooks, the 36ers would win their 2nd and Ninnis his 3rd NBL championship in 1998 after sweeping the Magic, whose own record that year had almost rivaled that of the 1986 36ers, 2–0 in the Grand Final.

Ninnis won his 4th SA State League championship with South Adelaide in 1997.

Scott Ninnis retired from playing following the 1998 NBL season having played 318 games and averaging 9.2 points, 1.7 rebounds and 2.2 assists per game

International career
Scott Ninnis' form during the 1993 NBL season saw him selected for a number of games with the Australian Boomers.

Coaching
Following the 36ers 1998 championship win, coach Phil Smyth offered Ninnis the chance of a one-year playing contract or a position as the team's assistant coach alongside former NBL player Steve Breheny. Ninnis accepted the offer to become the 36ers assistant coach and in that position would go on to win two more NBL championships in 1998–99 and 2001–02. Ninnis would continue as the club's assistant coach until the end of the 2002–03 NBL season.

In 2001–2002 while still the assistant coach with the 36ers, Scott Ninnis coached the Sturt Sabres in the CABL. During that time the Sabres were the CABL Central Conference Champions with Ninnis named as the CABL Coach of the Year in 2002.

After not coaching Sturt in 2003, Ninnis returned in 2004 before accepting an offer to become assistant coach of the NBL's Townsville Crocodiles for the 2004–05 NBL season. He then became the assistant coach to former NBA All-Star Mark Price (later replaced by Shane Heal) at the club South Dragons from 2006 to 2007.

With Smyth not retained by the 36ers after missing the playoffs two seasons in a row, Ninnis became an NBL head coach in 2008–09, leading the 36ers to that years Quarter Finals where they were beaten in a single game playoff by the New Zealand Breakers coached by his former Magic teammate Andrej Lemanis. After the 36ers finished with its first wooden spoon in 2009–10, Ninnis was sacked by the 36ers, effectively ending his NBL career.

Accolades
Scott Ninnis appeared in 9 NBL finals series, 5 NBL Grand Finals and won 3 NBL championships as a player. He also won the SEABL Championship with the Adelaide Buffaloes in 1987 and won the SA State League Championship with South Adelaide in 1987, 1989, 1995 and 1997. In 1995, Scott Ninnis won the Woollacott Medal as the fairest and most brilliant player in South Australian basketball.

In 1993, Ninnis was named as the NBL's Most Improved Player.

In March 2015, Scott Ninnis had his #9 singlet retired by the South Adelaide Basketball Club. The Panthers also retired the #8 of Australian Basketball Hall of Fame members Michael Ah Matt (#8) who had played alongside Bruce Ninnis at the Panthers during the 1960s, as well as the #33 of Ninnis' long time Adelaide 36ers teammate Mark Davis.

Scott Ninnis is the only person as either a player or coach who has been a member of all 4 Adelaide 36ers NBL Championship winning teams.

Current
As of 2016, Ninnis lives in Adelaide with his second wife Rebekah and their 2-year-old son Patrick Bruce. He also has a 12-year-old daughter, Chiara, from his first marriage. After being sacked as the 36ers coach following the 2009–10 NBL season, Ninnis formed his own wine tour company Premium Wine Tours.

SA State League Honour roll

NBL Honour roll

NBL career stats

Player

|-
| style="text-align:left; background:#afe6ba;"| 1986†
| style="text-align:left;"| Adelaide 36ers
| 14 || 0 || NA || .375 || 1.000 || .333 || 0.1 || 0.0 || 0.0 || 0.0 || 0.6
|-
| style="text-align:left"| 1987
| style="text-align:left;"| Adelaide 36ers
| 2 || 0 || 2.5 || .667 || .000 || .000 || 0.0 || 0.5 || 0.0 || 0.0 || 2.0
|-
| style="text-align:left"| 1988
| style="text-align:left;"| Adelaide 36ers
| 18 || 0 || 12.3 || .519 || .389 || .706 || 1.4 || 1.1 || 0.3 || 0.1 || 5.5
|-
| style="text-align:left"| 1989
| style="text-align:left;"| Adelaide 36ers
| 24 || 0 || 15.8 || .548 || .370 || .683 || 1.7 || 1.5 || 0.4 || 0.2 || 8.3
|-
| style="text-align:left"| 1990
| style="text-align:left;"| Adelaide 36ers
| 26 || 0 || 22.0 || .465 || .355 || .629 || 2.4 || 3.8 || 0.6 || 0.2 || 10.2
|-
| style="text-align:left"| 1991
| style="text-align:left;"| Eastside Melbourne Spectres
| 31 || 0 || 12.4 || .474 || .254 || .693 || 1.5 || 2.1 || 0.7 || 0.2 || 9.3
|-
| style="text-align:left; background:#afe6ba;"| 1992†
| style="text-align:left;"| South East Melbourne Magic
| 30 || 0 || 23.9 || .489 || .280 || .680 || 1.8 || 2.5 || 1.2 || 0.0 || 11.7
|-
| style="text-align:left"| 1993
| style="text-align:left;"| Adelaide 36ers
| 28 || 28 || 40.5 || .465 || .390 || .726 || 3.1 || 4.7 || 1.3 || 0.2 || 19.4
|-
| style="text-align:left"| 1994
| style="text-align:left;"| Adelaide 36ers
| 33 || NA || 25.6 || .465 || .390 || .726 || 2.0 || 3.0 || 1.4 || 0.1 || 12.6
|-
| style="text-align:left"| 1995
| style="text-align:left;"| Adelaide 36ers
| 31 || 0 || 15.0 || .411 || .407 || .733 || 1.7 || 1.4 || 0.8 || 0.0 || 5.6
|-
| style="text-align:left"| 1996
| style="text-align:left;"| Newcastle Falcons
| 24 || NA || 27.9 || .411 || .407 || .658 || 2.5 || 3.0 || 1.0 || 0.3 || 13.1
|-
| style="text-align:left"| 1997
| style="text-align:left;"| Adelaide 36ers
| 27 || 0 || 10.8 || .516 || .273 || .600 || 0.9 || 1.0 || 0.5 || 0.0 || 4.2
|-
| style="text-align:left; background:#afe6ba;"| 1998†
| style="text-align:left;"| Adelaide 36ers
| 30 || 0 || 11.9 || .451 || .314 || .653 || 1.0 || 1.1 || 0.4 || 0.0 || 5.4
|- class="sortbottom"
| style="text-align:center;" colspan="2" | Career
| 318 || NA || NA || .474 || .342 || .683 || 1.7 || 2.2 || 0.8 || 0.1 || 9.2
|}

Coaching

|- 
| align="left" |Adelaide 36ers
| align="left" |2008–09
|30||15||15|||| align="center" |6th ||1||0||1||
| align="center" |Elimination-Finalists
|-class="sortbottom"
|- 
| align="left" |Adelaide 36ers
| align="left" |2009–10
|28||10||18|||| align="center" |8th ||—||—||—||—
| align="center" |Missed Playoffs
|-class="sortbottom"
| align="left" |Career
| ||58||25||33|||| ||1||0||1||

References

External links
Profile at andthefoul.net

1965 births
Living people
Adelaide 36ers coaches
Adelaide 36ers players
Australian men's basketball players
Eastside Spectres players
Newcastle Falcons (basketball) players
Shooting guards
South East Melbourne Magic players
Basketball players from Adelaide